Eliza Woods was an African-American woman who was lynched on 19 August 1886 in Jackson, Tennessee, after being accused of poisoning and killing her employer, Jessie Woolen.

Woods had been Woolen's cook. When it was found that Woolen's stomach contained arsenic and that Woods had a box of rat poison at home, it was concluded that she was responsible for the death. A crowd of 1,000 was reportedly present when Woods was dragged from the jail and hanged naked in front of the courthouse. Bullets were then shot into her body.  This lynching was notable both for the gender of the victim and the biracial participation of the crowd.  Three years later, in 1889, Woolen's husband confessed that he had killed his wife.

The case was among the first that Ida B. Wells (1862–1931) wrote about before becoming a prominent anti-lynching campaigner.

Notes

Lynching deaths in Tennessee
Racially motivated violence against African Americans
American murder victims
People murdered in Tennessee
Murdered African-American people
1886 in Tennessee
1886 murders in the United States
August 1886 events
Female murder victims
History of women in Tennessee
Jackson, Tennessee
African-American history of Tennessee